Dieter Medicus (born 7 April 1957) is a German ice hockey player. He competed in the men's tournament at the 1988 Winter Olympics.

References

External links
 

1957 births
Living people
German ice hockey players
Olympic ice hockey players of West Germany
Ice hockey players at the 1988 Winter Olympics
People from Kaufbeuren
Sportspeople from Swabia (Bavaria)